The Harrison Parker Sr. House is a historic house in Winchester, Massachusetts.  The -story wood-frame house was built in 1843 by Harrison Parker Sr., the owner of a local lumber mill.  It is also one of the finer examples of Italianate style in the town, with a low-pitch hip roof with wide eaves decorated with brackets, and small attic windows set in the architrave.  The second story windows have round-arch tops, and there are decorated porches on three sides.  The interior includes well-preserved period details.

The house was listed on the National Register of Historic Places in 1989.

See also
National Register of Historic Places listings in Winchester, Massachusetts

References

Houses on the National Register of Historic Places in Winchester, Massachusetts
Houses in Winchester, Massachusetts